Queen of the Clouds is the debut studio album by Swedish singer Tove Lo. It was released on 24 September 2014 by Island Records. The album follows her first extended play Truth Serum (2014) and includes the successful singles "Habits (Stay High)" and "Talking Body". Lo worked with several writers and producers such as The Struts, Klas Åhlund, Alexander Kronlund, Alx Reuterskiöld, and Captain Cuts. Musically, Queen of the Clouds is primarily a electropop, dance-pop and synth-pop record. Lyrically, the album's themes center on the stages of a relationship, including passion, love and break-ups.

Queen of the Clouds garnered generally positive reviews from music critics, who praised its production and lyrical content. It was promoted with television performances and through the Queen of the Clouds Tour. On 25 September 2015, a year after the album's original release, a "blueprint" edition was announced; the bonus length features tracks from Truth Serum, a new version of "Moments", the originally Spotify-exclusive "Not Made for This World", and an explicit version of The Hunger Games: Mockingjay – Part 1 "Scream My Name".

Background and development
Queen of the Clouds is the follow-up to Lo's debut extended play Truth Serum. The album is divided into three sections: "The Sex", "The Love" and "The Pain". Similar to theme of a poisoned relationship in Truth Serum, the album centers on a breakup and provides a complete story of her romantic struggles. She described her music as like a therapist where she could sing about things she would not normally dare to speak about. The title for the album came from her song "Not on Drugs" and describes her new lifestyle touring the world after the success of her first EP. Lo said that it represented the feeling of "floating on top of the world" and that it was important that the album title represented her.

Composition
Heavily influenced by electropop musical styles, Queen of the Clouds is predominantly a concept album which divides the record into three sections: "The Sex", "The Love" and "The Pain". Similar to the theme of poisoned relationships explored on Lo's debut extended play, Truth Serum (2014), the album centers on a breakup and provides a complete narration of her romantic struggles. She described her music as "like a therapist" where Lo could sing about things she would not normally feel comfortable speaking about. Queen of the Clouds blends multiple styles of music into a "monogenre" sound, containing heavy influences of EDM, hip hop, dance-pop, new wave, rock, and R&B, combining them into a "seamless compendium".

The first section, "The Sex", opens the record with four songs about the "lecherous and reckless" beginning of a relationship, and are composed in an "infectious and tongue-in-cheek stampede of uptempo pop." Album opener, "My Gun", has been described as an urban-influenced pop song textured with elements of dancehall. It begins with a "mournful"-sounding choir before building to an upbeat pop groove. Lo's vocals are low and seductive, before gliding into her higher range. The track explores the "flirty" stage before delving into more sexual themes, found later on "Talking Body", and has been compared to the works of Rihanna. Lyrically, Lo compares her lover to "her gun" and sings of feeling a release of pleasure: "Boy, if you're gonna shoot me down/Do it gently". The next track, "Like Em' Young", is driven by a tribal-influenced rhythm "coated" with a "parade" of dub-bass. Its lyrics are satirical in nature, as she criticises other women for judging her taste in younger men: "Hey girl, why you judging me/When your, your guy is turning 53?/ I don't know what really gets you more/Is it that my guy's gonna live out yours?" "Talking Body" is a heavily sexual song described as "salivating with carnal lust", and according to Ken Capobianco of The Boston Globe, evokes "the rush of early Madonna."  Lyrically, the verses see Lo in a state of idée fixe towards her partner, as she finds herself revolving her life around him. The chorus is musically armed with heavy propulsion combined with rising, subdued synths and sees her "objectifying" his model physique. Rounding out the first section is "Timebomb", a frantic electronic dance piano ballad hybrid described as a "sonic bombardment" of "euphoric" chords, drums, and psychedelic synths, and features an "explosive" chorus containing crashing cymbals and pounding bass. Lo's vocals in the track are sung out of time to the beat, rushing her lyrics into a single phrase.

The second section, "The Love", has been described as "a thunderous yearning through gigantic mid tempo, electronic balladry". It opens with the "volcanic" ballad "Moments", which boasts atmospherics and influences of "trippy" samba. Lyrically, it sees Lo confessing her flaws before declaring "On good days, I am charming as fuck!". "The Way That I Am" is a dubstep song filled with "pain and passion" as Lo sings in a soulful rasp and lyrically cries out to her partner to love her as she is; including flaws. "Got Love" is one of the albums "pure" pop moments, and contains an unwaveringly positive attitude. Lyrically, she rejoices exultant feelings of first falling in love as she sings "Good enough to make the ocean look like it's a pond/Good enough to turn the valleys into mountain tops", and discusses the theme of immortality "We live like legends now, know that would never die/Oh, we Got Love". Closing out the section is the power pop song "Not on Drugs". Primarily a guitar-driven song that explores the topic of a feeling of love so bewildering and overpowering that it affects your behavior, as if you were on drugs.

The final section is "The Pain" which explores the difficulty piecing together one's life after the destruction and demise of a relationship through "distraught" lyricism and melancholic pop. The section opens with the "thunderous" electropop power-ballad "Thousand Miles", which lyrically depicts Lo's obsession with reuniting with her lost love at all costs, even if it means running "a thousand miles". Musically, the mid-tempo track tells a story of a girl "struggling to forget a rocky relationship with an ex," and is sonically amped up by the singer's "emotionally distraught" vocals and "thundering" drum rhythms. The following song, "Habits (Stay High)" sees her emotionally unravel even more, as she talks about self-medicating by smoking marijuana to cope to live without her lover. It's "snappy" verses are filled with "quietly distinct, often strange imagery", including Lo eating her dinner in the bathtub, getting drunken munchies, and seducing dads on the playground. Musically, it is a Purity Ring-inspired song, and creates a calming atmosphere compared to that of morphine. "This Time Around" is a dark Charli XCX-inspired track which reflects on the lessons learned from a heartbreak. Lo's vocal performance on the song has been described as particularly yearning and broken. The final song of the section and album is "Run on Love", an "easy-going" reworked nu-disco dance collaboration with EDM producer Lucas Nord. Lyrically, Lo sings of picking up her heart and choosing to no longer be a victim by living in the moment enjoy time with her lover before it runs out.

Release and promotion
Lo announced the release of Queen of the Clouds in an interview with Rolling Stone on 19 August 2014. Shortly after, on 9 September 2014, the album was made available to pre-order online through iTunes. On 16 September 2014, the album tracks "Moments", "Timebomb" and "Thousand Miles" were also made available to download alongside the iTunes pre-order. On 24 September 2014, Lo performed "Habits" on Jimmy Kimmel Live! to promote her album. The album was also supported by the Queen of the Clouds Tour between September and November 2015.

Singles
The lead single, "Habits (Stay High)", was originally released as "Habits" on 25 March 2013 prior to the release of Truth Serum in March 2014. It was later re-released as "Habits (Stay High)" on 6 December 2013. "Habits (Stay High)" peaked at number three on the US Billboard Hot 100 in 2014. A remix of "Habits" by record production duo Hippie Sabotage, alternatively titled "Stay High", was released on 3 March 2014 and peaked at number 13 on the Swedish Singles Chart. It performed even more successfully elsewhere, peaking within the top 10 of the charts in Norway, the Netherlands, France, the United Kingdom, New Zealand and Australia.

"Not on Drugs" was originally revealed as the album's second single with its lyric video of the premiering in June 2014 and its music video premiering in August of the same year, but a different single, "Talking Body", was chosen to replace it, impacting pop radio on 20 January 2015. "Talking Body" has since peaked at number 12 on the Hot 100 as of 20 May 2015.

On 23 May 2015, at the Boston Calling Music Festival, Lo announced that "Timebomb" would serve as the third single. It was digitally released on 12 August 2015.
However, Republic Records, which handles Lo's American radio promotions, opted not to push "Timebomb" to radio. Instead, "Moments" impacted pop radio on 13 October 2015, as the fourth single from the album.

Critical reception

Upon release, Queen of the Clouds received positive reviews from music critics. According to Metacritic, the album received an average score of 73/100 based on 4 reviews. Sam Lansky from Time praised the lyrical content of the album, stating that "the tracks all have a satisfying stomp and crash, but it's her lyrics that shine brightest, trading in pop clichés but flipping them in the same breath." He described the hooks of the tracks as commercial enough to give Lo a "fighting chance at stateside stardom". Carrie Battan from Pitchfork gave the album a 7.2 out of 10 and described her music as "bruised, brightly arranged pop songs that feel grand but not excessive". She also noted that her "disarming honesty" and "well-phrased lyrics" are what sticks to the brain. Evan Ross from andPOP gave the album 3.5 out of 5 stars described Queen of the Clouds as "a really enjoyable album that pretty accurately describes what it's like to be young and in love" and particularly liked that the album was an entire concept instead of randomly thrown in tracks. He praised the production and enjoyable filler songs. He also noted that Lo's "EDM-inspired album" had more substance than other similar albums. Maxie Molotov-Smith from Fortitude Magazine gave the album 4.5 out of 5 stars, praising the "stark heart-on-sleeve" honesty in Lo's lyrics and described the music as "expertly-crafted electronic pop music" with infectious hooks.

Jon O'Brien from Music Is My Oxygen gave the album 4 out of 5 stars and praised Lo's standing out from the crowd, describing her album as a "refreshingly raw debut which casts Tove Lo as pop's premier hot mess". Kathy Iandoli from Idolator gave the album 3.5 out of 5 and praised the honesty of the lyrics and noted that Lo "has become masterfully adept at jamming thoughtful words into dancey songs through her past songwriting, but she takes it a step further with Queen Of The Clouds". A reviewer from PressPLAY gave the album a 4 out of 5 and praised the album's lyrical content and that Lo "goes into the dark places that modern pop tends to avoid", although they also wrote that there was a "slight need for variety and a tighter edit of the tracklist". The critic also described Lo as having a "frantic, drunken energy [...] that keeps you hooked on her songs unlike any of her peers"

Commercial performance
In Lo's native Sweden, Queen of the Clouds debuted at number six on the Sverigetopplistan charts, remaining in the top 100 for 79 weeks. Sverigetopplistan reports that Queen of the Clouds is the 58th most successful album of all time in Sweden. In the United States, the album entered the Billboard 200 at number 14 with first-week sales of 19,000 copies. As of August 2016, it had sold 190,000 copies in the US. The album debuted at number 17 on the UK Albums Chart, selling 4,722 copies in its first week. The album also peaked within the top 50 in Australia, Finland, New Zealand and Norway.

Track listing

Notes
  signifies an additional producer
  signifies a co-producer
  signifies a remixer

Personnel
Credits adapted from the liner notes of the international standard edition of Queen of the Clouds.

Musicians

 Tove Lo – songwriting ;  vocals ; backing vocals 
 The Struts – keyboards, guitars ; bass ; programming ; all instruments ; all keyboards 
 Daniel Ledinsky – strings, backing vocals 
 Shellback – additional programming, keyboards 
 Klas Åhlund – instruments, programming 
 David Nyström – piano 
 Mattman & Robin – all instruments, programming 
 Ali Payami – all instruments, programming 
 Filip Runesson – strings 
 Alx Reuterskiöld – keyboards 
 Scribz Riley – all instruments, programming 
 Kyle Shearer – all instruments 
 Jeffrey Saurer – musical arrangement 
 Kevin Saurer – musical arrangement

Technical

 The Struts – production ; engineering 
 Daniel Ledinsky – additional production 
 Spyke Lee – engineering assistance 
 Lars Norgren – mixing 
 Shellback – production 
 Serban Ghenea – mixing 
 John Hanes – engineering for mix 
 Klas Åhlund – production 
 Michael Illbert – mixing 
 Mattman & Robin – production 
 Ali Payami – production 
 Alx Reuterskiöld – co-production 
 Scribz Riley – production 
 Kyle Shearer – production 
 Robert Marvin – additional engineering 
 Andy Selby – vocal editing 
 Lucas Nord – production, mixing 
 Hippie Sabotage – remix, additional production 
 Björn Engelmann – mastering

Artwork

 Daniel Åberg – art direction, design, cover design
 Johannes Helje – cover design, photography, photo editing
 Clara Tägtström – cover design
 Tove Lo – cover design, hand lettering titles
 Oskar Wettergren – hand lettering front and chapters

Charts

Weekly charts

Year-end charts

Certifications

Release history

Notes

References

2014 debut albums
Albums produced by Klas Åhlund
Albums produced by Mattman & Robin
Albums produced by Shellback (record producer)
Concept albums
Island Records albums
Tove Lo albums
European Border Breakers Award-winning albums